Hilding Bladh (1906–1982) was a Swedish cinematographer. He worked on around 90 film productions initially as a camera assistant before graduating to director of photography. He worked several times with director Ingmar Bergman.

Selected filmography
 Close Relations (1935)
 A Crime (1940)
 A Real Man (1940)
 Life Goes On (1941)
 The Poor Millionaire (1941)
 Woman on Board (1941)
 Sonja (1943)
 The Sixth Shot (1943)
 We Need Each Other (1944)
 The Girl and the Devil (1944)
 His Excellency (1944)
 Fram för lilla Märta (1945)
 Interlude (1946)
 It Rains on Our Love (1946)
 Neglected by His Wife (1947)
 No Way Back (1947)
 Carnival Evening (1948)
 Son of the Sea (1949)
 Playing Truant (1949)
 My Sister and I (1950)
 The Motor Cavaliers (1950)
 Teacher's First Born (1950)
 My Name Is Puck (1951)
 One Fiancée at a Time (1952)
 All the World's Delights (1953)
 Sawdust and Tinsel (1953)
 Ursula, the Girl from the Finnish Forests (1953)
 Enchanted Walk (1954)
 Dreams (1955)
 Whoops! (1955)
 Musik ombord (1958)
 Space Invasion of Lapland (1959)
 Rider in Blue (1959)
 The Lady in White (1962)

References

Bibliography
 Steene, Birgitta. Ingmar Bergman: A Reference Guide. Amsterdam University Press, 2005.

External links

1906 births
1982 deaths
Swedish cinematographers
People from Stockholm